Anastasia "Naina" Iosifovna Yeltsina (born 14 March 1932) is the widow of the first President of Russia, Boris Yeltsin.

Early life and education

Naina Yeltsina was born in the Orenburg Oblast in 1932. After graduating from the construction faculty at the Ural Polytechnic Institute in Sverdlovsk (now Yekaterinburg) in 1955, she worked with various projects at the Sverdlovsk Institute.

Personal life
In 1956, she married Boris Yeltsin, whom she met at the Sverdlovsk institute, and has lived in Moscow since 1985. They have two daughters, Yelena and Tatyana, born in 1957 and 1960, respectively.

First lady
Naina Yeltsina was rarely seen in public. She accompanied her husband on some of his foreign visits including 1997 visits to Sweden and Finland and a 1999 visit to China. As a rule, Naina Yeltsina never interfered in her husband's political work; however, in the 1996 election campaign, she met with voters and gave interviews to the media. She made a major public appearance in April 2007 at her husband's state funeral in Moscow.

Later life
In 2017, Naina Yeltsina  launched her autobiography at the book at both the Yeltsin Center and then in Moscow.

References

External links

|-

1932 births
Living people
First Ladies of Russia
People from Sharlyksky District
Recipients of the Cavaliers Order of Saint Catherine the Great Martyr
Family of Boris Yeltsin